The Rishon LeZion–Modi'in railway (also known as 431 railway and Sorek railway) is a railway project under construction linking the cities of Rishon LeZion and Modi'in in central Israel. The project will form a part of Israel Railways' suburban rail network serving the Tel Aviv metropolitan area, as well as provide an east-west connection between the Tel Aviv–Ashkelon, Tel Aviv–Beersheba and Tel Aviv–Jerusalem rail corridors.

Works on the railway started in November 2019, and the project is scheduled to open in 2026 at an estimated cost of NIS 3.2 billion.

History

Background
The line incorporates two small sections of existing infrastructure which were previously disjointed spur lines. The  single-track Be'er Ya'akov–Rishon LeZion railway, which branched off the British-period Lod–Ashkelon railway and terminated at Rishon LeZion HaRishonim, opened in 2003. The  double-track Anava–Modi'in railway, a branch of the Tel Aviv–Jerusalem railway (which was only completed up to Ben Gurion Airport at the time), opened in segments between 2007 and 2008, terminating at Modi'in Center.

In 2005, works began on the construction of Route 431, a limited-access freeway connecting Rishon LeZion with Modi'in. Traffic lanes were built on either side of both the Be'er Ya'akov–Rishon LeZion and Anava–Modi'in railways, incorporating the existing rail tracks into the new highway median, in a manner similar to Ayalon freeway-railway in central Tel Aviv. The highway was additionally designed to accommodate a dual-track railroad in its median for much of its length, guaranteeing right-of-way to extend and connect these two sections and thus creating the potential for a new contiguous Rishon LeZion–Modi'in corridor.

Additionally, the Rishon LeZion Moshe Dayan–Yavne West section of the Tel Aviv–Bnei Darom railway, which opened in 2012, was also designed with provisions for a tunnel branching eastwards, to connect to the western end of the future Rishon LeZion–Modi'in line.

Planning
In 2010, plans for the construction of the Rishon LeZion–Modi'in railway were submitted to the Center District planning committee. Objections were submitted by 2012. 

In 2014, it was decided to re-route the western section of the railway, between Moshe Dayan and HaRishonim, which had been planned to run through the built-up area of Rishon LeZion along Rabin Avenue. Rishon LeZion municipality and residents were opposed to the construction of a train station close to residential neighbourhoods, prompting the rail line to be diverted outside the city. Instead, the revised plan called for the line to run on a viaduct on the south side of Route 431, and the station which had been planned to service western Rishon LeZion and COMAS college was relocated to Me'uyan Sorek Business Park.

As such, the majority of the route east of HaRishonim was approved in 2014, while the western HaRishonim–Moshe Dayan section was processed separately and approved in 2017.

Construction
In December 2018, first tenders for the construction of the line were issued. The first construction contract was awarded in September 2019 to Electra Infrastructures. Construction works started in November 2019.

Contracts for other sections of the line were subsequently awarded to Solel Boneh, Shikun & Binui, and Danya Cebus all throughout 2020.

Two new railway stations are being built as part of the project, Rishon LeZion Me'uyan Sorek and Ramla South. In addition, works are being carried out in Rishon LeZion HaRishonim to extend the station platforms.

Stations
The 6 stations of the line include four pre-existing stations which were built in previous years as part of separate railway lines. 

Two brand new stations (marked †) will be built as part of the project, and at least one station (Rishon LeZion HaRishonim) will be significantly upgraded and expanded.

Operations
Israel Railways plans to run commuter services on the railway as part of a larger loop encompassing the Tel Aviv metropolitan area, and including the Sharon railway and Eastern railway. Frequency is planned to be 2 trains an hour for each direction, and double that following further expansions of the network. 

Israel Railways estimates that the railway will shorten travel times from Rishon LeZion to Modi'in from 60 to about 30 minutes, and carry 15,000 passengers per day.

Notes

References

External links
 Promotional video produced for Israel Railways

Standard gauge railways in Israel
Proposed railway lines in Israel
2026 in rail transport